Wenderson may refer to:
 Wender (footballer) (Wenderson de Arruda Said, born 1975), Brazilian footballer
 Wenderson (footballer, born 1998), Brazilian footballer
 Wenderson (footballer, born 1999), Brazilian footballer